UB-612 is a COVID-19 vaccine candidate developed by , and Vaxxinity, Inc.  It is a peptide vaccine.

It is composed of SARS-CoV-2 S1-RBD protein and synthetic peptides representing T cell (Th and CTL) epitopes on the nucleocapsid, spike and membrane proteins. The multitope composition is differentiated from other solely spike-protein based vaccines. By recognition against epitopes on Spike (S1-RBD and S2) and non-Spike (N and M) structure proteins, UB-612 provides B-cell and T-cell memory immunity and offers a potential as a universal vaccine to fend off the Omicron variant and new emerging variants of concern. Vaxxinity began seeking regulatory approval for UB-612 for use as a booster vaccine in the United Kingdom and Australia in 2022.

Technology 
UB-612 is a peptide vaccine incorporating multiple epitopes, including the spike protein receptor binding domain as well as other virus structural proteins.  The spike protein peptide is fused to an Fc domain of single-chain IgG1, and the other six peptides are derived from highly conserved sequences from the spike, nucleocapsid, and membrane proteins of SARS-CoV-1 and SARS-CoV-2.  It also contains a proprietary UBITh1 peptide derived from the measles virus fusion protein, CpG oligonucleotides, and aluminum phosphate adjuvant to improve the immune response.  It is produced in CHO cells.

Clinical trials 
In September 2020, phase I clinical trials of UB-612 started in Taiwan. and in January 2021, phase II clinical trials began in Taiwan.
In February 2021,  phase II/III clinical trials began. Results from clinical trials showing positive safety and efficacy data were published in May 2022.

In March 2022, Vaxxinity started an international phase III clinical trial of UB-612 as a heterologous booster vaccine against three approved platforms: mRNA, adenovirus vector, and inactivated virus. The company announced positive topline data of the trial in December 2022.

References

External links 

Clinical trials
Taiwanese COVID-19 vaccines
Peptide vaccines